Eden Township is a township in Walsh County, North Dakota, United States. 44.6% (25) of the population are male, and the other 55.4% (31) are female.

References

See also
Walsh County, North Dakota

Townships in North Dakota
Townships in Walsh County, North Dakota